Ganbarion (ガンバリオン Ganbarion) is a Japanese video game company founded on August 13, 1999. Their function is the planning/development of home video game software. Two of Ganbarion's major clients are Bandai Namco Entertainment and Nintendo. Their most notable works are games based on the popular manga and anime One Piece, Jump Super Stars, Jump Ultimate Stars, and Pandora's Tower. They also co-developed Wii Fit U with Nintendo EAD.

Games developed 
From TV Animation - One Piece: Grand Battle! (2001) (Japan and Europe Only)
From TV Animation - One Piece: Grand Battle! 2 (2002) (Japan only)
Azumanga Donjara Daioh (2002) (Japan only)
One Piece: Grand Battle! 3 (2003) (Japan only)
Vattroller X (2004) (Japan only)
One Piece: Grand Battle! Rush (2005) (Known as "Grand Battle" outside Japan)
Jump Super Stars (2005)
One Piece: Grand Adventure (2006) (North America and Europe Only)
Jump Ultimate Stars (2006)
One Piece: Unlimited Adventure (2007) (Japan and North America Only)
One Piece: Unlimited Cruise (2008-2009) (Japan and Europe Only)
One Piece: Gigant Battle (2010)
Pandora's Tower (2011)
Issho ni Asobou! Dream Theme Park (2011)  (Known as "Family Trainer: Magical Carnival" in Europe and "Active Life: Magical Carnival" in North America outside Japan)
Wii Fit U (2013, co-developed with Nintendo EAD)
One Piece: Unlimited World RED (2014)
One Piece: Super Grand Battle! X (2014) (Japan only)
World Trigger: Smash Borders (2015) (Japan only)
Golondia (2015) 
Dragon Ball Fusions (2016)
Shurado (2017)
One Piece: World Seeker (2019)
Engawa Danshi to Kemono Tan (2021)

References

External links
 

Video game companies of Japan
Video game development companies
Video game companies established in 1999
Japanese companies established in 1999
Companies based in Fukuoka Prefecture